John Lettengarver (April 29, 1929 – January 14, 1997) was an American figure skater who competed in men's singles.  He won the silver medal at the 1947 United States Figure Skating Championships and finished fourth at the 1948 Winter Olympics.

Lettengarver was born in Saint Paul, Minnesota and died in Edmonds, Washington.

Results

References

American male single skaters
Olympic figure skaters of the United States
Figure skaters at the 1948 Winter Olympics
Sportspeople from Saint Paul, Minnesota
1929 births
1997 deaths
20th-century American people